|}

The Spring Trophy is a Listed flat horse race in Great Britain open to horses aged three years or older.
It is run at Haydock Park over a distance of 6 furlongs and 212 yards, and it is scheduled to take place each year in May.

Winners since 1988

See also 
 Horse racing in Great Britain
 List of British flat horse races

Notes

References 
 Paris-Turf:
Racing Post:

Open mile category horse races
Haydock Park Racecourse
Flat races in Great Britain